The Styria state election of 2024 will be held in the Austrian state of Styria in the autumn of 2024.

Background 
In 2019, the ÖVP was able to make strong gains and became the strongest force with 18 of 48 seats. The SPÖ suffered heavy losses and fell to second place with 12 seats. The FPÖ lost even more support yet remained the third strongest force. The Greens, KPÖ and NEOS made gains, with the latter entering the state parliament for the first time.

In Styria there is no percentage threshold. To enter the Landtag, a basic mandate is required in one of the four constituencies (Graz and surroundings, Western Styria, Eastern Styria, Upper Styria).

Opinion polling

References 

Styria
State elections in Austria
2024 in Austria